Pro Volleyball League (PVL) was a professional men's indoor volleyball league in India. The inaugural season took place in February 2019. The league was an initiative between the Volleyball Federation of India, Head Digital Works Pvt. Ltd. and Baseline Ventures. The inaugural season of the league was won by Chennai Spartans. Later in the year 2022 the league was rebranded as Prime Volleyball League.

Structure 
The Pro Volleyball League encompassed six franchises, representing cities across India. All teams filed tenders with Baseline Ventures, listing the two cities they would be interested in bidding for. The teams were officially announced at a press conference in Mumbai.

Teams

Format 
Each team will have 12 players with the provision of a maximum of two reserve players. All teams have a salary purse of  lakhs from which they pick their team via an auction and player draft. Players are divided into five categories – International Icons, Indian Icons, Sr. Indian Internationals, Nationals, and U-21 players. The International Icon players are picked through a draft process while the Indian players are chosen via an auction. Ranjit Singh of Punjab emerged as the top pick in Season 1. Ahmedabad Defenders shelled out  lakhs for him at the auction.

There were a total of 18 matches in Season 1. Each team plays against each other in a round-robin format with the top 4 teams moving into the Semi-Finals. In Season 1, matches were held in Kochi at the Rajiv Gandhi Indoor Stadium and in Chennai at the Jawaharlal Nehru Stadium.

Season 1 

The first season started on  2 February 2019 and concluded on 22 February 2019.

Fixtures

See also 
 Prime Volleyball League

References

Sport in India
Volleyball in India
Professional sports leagues in India